George Forbes was the Chief Cashier of the Bank of England from 1866 to 1873. Forbes was replaced as Chief Cashier by Frank May.

References

Chief Cashiers of the Bank of England
Year of birth missing
Year of death missing